Modern Rocking is a solo album by Polish singer Agnieszka Chylińska.  It is the seventh studio album in her career.  In the first week of its release it made it to the OLiS list of best-selling Polish albums, and was certified gold. On November 18, 2009, it was certified platinum.

"Nie mogę Cię zapomnieć" won the 2010 "Digital Song of the Year" in Poland for being the best selling digital single of 2009.

Track listing
All songs written by Agnieszka Chylińska and produced by Bartek Królik and Marek Piotrkowski.

Personnel
The following is according to the source material.
 Agnieszka Chylińska – vocals
 Bartek Królik – bass guitar, guitar, keyboard, percussion, cello
 Marek Piotrowski – keyboard, percussion, programmable instruments
 Lester Estelle Jr – percussion

Charts and certifications

Charts

Year-end charts

Certifications

References

2009 albums
Agnieszka Chylińska albums